Liolaemus anomalus is a species of lizard in the family  Liolaemidae. It is native to Argentina.

References

anomalus
Reptiles described in 1896
Reptiles of Argentina
Taxa named by Julio Germán Koslowsky